Team Lotto–Kern Haus is a Continental cycling team founded in 2002 from the fusion between ComNet Cycle and Athleticum–Principia. It is based in Germany and it participates in UCI Continental Circuits races.

Team roster

Major wins 

2002
Stage 4 Tour of Japan, Stefan Ganser
2003
Stage 3 Giro del Capo, Luke Roberts
Stage 5 Ringerike GP, Luke Roberts
2004
Stage 5b Tour de Normandie, Luke Roberts
Stage 2 FBD Milk Ras, Stefan Cohnen
Stage 1 Rheinland-Pfalz Rundfahrt, Luke Roberts
2005
Rund um Düren, Robert Retschke
Overall Flèche du Sud, Wolfram Wiese
Stages 1 & 3b, Wolfram Wiese
Stages 3 & 5 Tour de Hokkaido, Tilo Schüler
2006
GP de la Ville de Lillers, Markus Eichler
Ronde van Drenthe, Markus Eichler
Rund um Düren, Elnathan Heizmann
Stage 1 OZ Wielerweekend, Wolfram Wiese
Rund um den Elm, Markus Eichler
GP de Dourges-Hénin-Beaumont, Markus Eichler
2007
Stage 4 Rheinland-Pfalz Rundfahrt, Björn Glasner
Stage 3 Tour of Thailand, Matthias Bertling
Stage 5 Tour of Thailand, Malaya van Ruitenbeek
2008
Stage 3 Giro del Capo, Luke Roberts
Stage 4 Flèche du Sud, Malaya van Ruitenbeek
Stage 4 Tour des Pyrénées, Malaya van Ruitenbeek
Stage 5 Tour of Thailand, Björn Glasner
2009
Rund um Düren, Dennis Pohl
Stages 3 & 4 Thüringen Rundfahrt der U23, Andreas Stauff
Stage 1 Tour des Pyrénées, Dennis Pohl
2011
Eschborn–Frankfurt City Loop U23, Patrick Bercz
2015
Stage 4 Tour de Berlin, Max Walscheid
Stage 2 Tour de Gironde, Marcel Meisen
Stage 3 Oberösterreich Rundfahrt, Marcel Meisen
Kernen Omloop Echt-Susteren, Max Walscheid
2016
Chrono Champenois, Daniel Westmattelmann
Stage 2 Flèche du Sud, Raphael Freienstein
2018
Arno Wallaard Memorial, Joshua Huppertz
Stage 1 Bałtyk–Karkonosze Tour, Fabian Schormair
2021
Stage 1 International Tour of Rhodes, Christian Koch
Stage 1 Tour d'Eure-et-Loir, Kim Heiduk
Stage 1 Czech Cycling Tour, Joshua Huppertz
2022
Stage 1 South Aegean Tour, Luca Dreßler

References

External links 

UCI Continental Teams (Europe)
Cycling teams based in Germany
Cycling teams established in 2002